Scopula subpartita is a moth of the  family Geometridae. It is found in India (the Khasia hills).

References

Moths described in 1919
subpartita
Moths of Asia